The Score is a Philippine English-language sports news television program broadcast on ABS-CBN Sports and Action (S+A), debuting on January 20, 2014, just two days after the network began operating. The show premiered on January 20, 2014 and airs every Sundays, Mondays, Tuesdays, Thursdays and Fridays at 6:00 PM (PST).

History

After 4 years of broadcasting in standard-definition television (480i, 4:3 SDTV) format, The Score has switched to high-definition television (1080i, 16:9 HDTV) format starting on April 2, 2018.

From May 5, 2020, the show has temporarily moved to Liga due to the temporary closure of ABS-CBN, which included as S+A is a free TV channel because of the cease and desist order of the National Telecommunications Commission (NTC), following the expiration of the network's 25-year franchise granted in 1995.

The show ended on July 22, 2020.

Anchors
The program's final anchor is Mico Halili, who started in 2018. Its former anchors are TJ Manotoc (2014–2018), who was reassigned to be the ABS-CBN News correspondent for North America (last March 2019, Manotoc promotes as ABS-CBN Bureau Chief for North America), and Anton Roxas (2018). Later on, Halili became a new Cignal TV's Creative Director for sports programmes on October 28, 2020.

Gretchen Ho serves as a segment host.

See also
 List of programs aired by ABS-CBN Sports and Action

References

2020s Philippine television series
2014 Philippine television series debuts
2020 Philippine television series endings
ABS-CBN Sports and Action original programming
English-language television shows
Filipino-language television shows
Philippine sports television series
Flagship evening news shows